Plamen Nikolov (born 20 August 1961) is a Bulgarian former professional footballer who played as a goalkeeper. 

Born in Dryanovo, Nikolov started his career at local Lokomotiv Dryanovo. He played 251 games in the Bulgarian First League over 17 seasons, appearing in the competition for Lokomotiv Sofia, Levski Sofia and Septemvri Sofia.

Throughout his career, Nikolov earned six caps for the Bulgaria national team and was a member of the squad that reached the semi-finals of the 1994 World Cup. He replaced Borislav Mihaylov in the second half-time during the third place match against Sweden.

Honours
Lokomotiv Sofia
Bulgarian Cup: 1981–82

Levski Sofia
A Group: 1992–93, 1993–94, 1994–95
Bulgarian Cup: 1991–92, 1993–94

Bulgaria
FIFA World Cup: fourth place 1994

References

External links
 
 Profile at LevskiSofia.info

1961 births
Living people
Bulgarian footballers
Bulgaria international footballers
Association football goalkeepers
1994 FIFA World Cup players
FC Lokomotiv 1929 Sofia players
PFC Levski Sofia players
FC Septemvri Sofia players
First Professional Football League (Bulgaria) players
People from Dryanovo